Safir Hotels & Resorts (also known as Safir International Hotels Management ) is a Kuwaiti-owned luxury hotel chain in the Arabic world. Clientele includes the sister of the Emir of Kuwait who stayed in the hotel's $3000 a month apartments (as of 1991).

Hotels

Algeria
Safir Mazafran is a hotel in Zeralda. It is said to "dominate the town" and has a restaurant serving Lebanese cuisine.

Egypt

Safir Hotel is a hotel in Zamalek, Cairo.

Safir Resort is a hotel and resort in Hurghada.

Kuwait
Safir International Hotel is a hotel in Bneid Al Gar. 

Failaka Heritage Village is a hotel in Failaka Island. Completed in 2002, it has 50 chalets and 24 rooms. It is located in a Heritage Village which includes a children's zoo, lake, horse-riding and shwarma outlets and a golf course.  	 
 	  	 	
Safir Airport Hotel is a hotel in Farwaniya.

Safir Hotel & Residences is a hotel in Fintas. 	 

Marina Hotel is a hotel in Salmiya.

Lebanon
Safir Hotel Bhamdoun is a hotel in Bhamdoun. It has 68 rooms and suites.

Coordinates:

Qatar
Safir Doha is a hotel in Doha.

Syria
Safir Al Sayedah Zeinab is a hotel in Damascus. 

Safir Hotel Homs is a hotel in Homs.

References

14. Elephant Rides For Every One-India "suvesh" +91 8553023689

External links and references
Official site

Hospitality companies of Kuwait